Dalton is an unincorporated census-designated place in the town of Kingston located in the southwestern corner of Green Lake County, Wisconsin, United States. It is located on Wisconsin Highway 44. It uses ZIP code 53926. As of the 2010 census, its population was 206. The surrounding countryside is mainly occupied by dairy farmers and an Amish community. Dalton was named for John Dalton, who emigrated from Ireland with his family in the early 1850s.

Climate

According to the Köppen Climate Classification system, Dalton has a warm-summer humid continental climate, abbreviated "Dfb" on climate maps.

References

External links
Dalton Fire Department, Dalton, Wisconsin; Retrieved February 7, 2007

Census-designated places in Green Lake County, Wisconsin
Census-designated places in Wisconsin